

A-F
List of places in Colorado A through F

G-O
List of places in Colorado G through O

P

Q

R

S

T

U

V

W

X

Y

Z

References